The Mueller Bridge near La Vernia, Texas, also known as Bridge at McAlister Crossing, is a Warren polygonal chord truss bridge that was built in 1915.  It was built by the Alamo Construction Co.  It was listed on the National Register of Historic Places in 2007.

See also

National Register of Historic Places listings in Wilson County, Texas
List of bridges on the National Register of Historic Places in Texas
Recorded Texas Historic Landmarks in Wilson County

References

External links

Road bridges on the National Register of Historic Places in Texas
Bridges completed in 1915
National Register of Historic Places in Wilson County, Texas
Recorded Texas Historic Landmarks
Warren truss bridges in the United States
Buildings and structures in Wilson County, Texas